Read's Department Stores was a Bridgeport, Connecticut-based retail chain founded in 1857 by D. M. Read. Known for its classy, upscale merchandise, the flagship store was once hailed as New England's largest department store. It expanded to several other locations in the 1950s and 1960s, but these closed progressively through the 1980s and 1990s.

The original Bridgeport store closed in 1981 when Read's moved to a new location, and was later extensively renovated and reopened as Artspace Read's, also known as the Sterling Market Lofts building.

Founding and growth 

In 1857, David M. Read and W. B. Hall opened a dry goods and carpet store on Main Street in Bridgeport, Connecticut, with Read going solo in 1877. In 1885, the business expanded to two buildings on Main Street and Fairfield Avenue forming a "very popular and elegant place of business." Read's became known for its classy, upscale merchandise and shopping environment, becoming New England's largest department store.

Flagship store
D.M. Read Company became a unit of Allied Stores in 1954.

The store had seven floors, five above ground and two below, and sold all sorts of items which according to the Bridgeport store directory were:

Downstairs
China • Glassware • Silver • Gifts • Lamps • Housewares

Street Floor
Jewelry • Watch Repair • Cosmetics • Gloves • Small Leather Goods • Belts • Handbags • Fashion Accessories • Neckwear • Hosiery • Casual Shoe Bar • Hat Bar • Umbrellas • Blouses • Street Floor Sportswear • Street Floor Lingerie • Fashion Shoes • Corner I • Notions • Stationery • Cameras • Luggage • Confections • Snack Shop
John Street Men's Furnishings • Men's Sportswear • Men's Clothing • Men's Shoes • Men's Hats
East Building Appliance Center
Post Office Arcade Casual Shop

Second Floor
Domestics • Curtains • Draperies • Slipcovers • Portrait Studio
Young World Shops Infants' Shop • 2-to-6 Shop • Boys' Shop • Girls' Shop • Subteen Shop • Teen Shop • Young World Shoes • Children's Furniture

Third Floor
Sportswear • Dresses • Daytime Dresses • Coats • Suits • Town and Country Shop • Fairfield Room • Millinery • Fur Salon • Bride's Shop • Uniforms • Maternity Shop • Lingerie • Foundations • At Ease Shop
Jr. News Jr. Dresses • Jr. Coats • Jr. Sportswear

Fourth Floor
Bedding • Furniture • Rugs • Broadloom • Photo Studio • Trim-a-Home Shop • Beauty Salon

Fifth Floor
Toyland • Bicycles • Outdoor Equipment • Books • Venetian Tea Room • Offices

Branch stores 
The second store was built as one of the two anchors in the new Trumbull Shopping Park (the state's first mall), 6.7 miles from downtown Bridgeport.  The store had three floors,, and was located in the south section of the mall where Target stands today.

Allied expanded the store into a chain in the 1950s and 1960s.
By then they were up to six stores in Fairfield and New Haven Counties in Connecticut.

Transition 
In 1981, Allied closed Read's landmark downtown store, leaving behind a boarded-up building as a reminder of Bridgeport's brighter past. It moved the store into space recently vacated by Gimbel's at the nearby Lafayette Plaza Mall in downtown Bridgeport.

In 1983, Read's opened a New York location in the Jefferson Valley Mall in Yorktown Heights. Around 1985 its television and radio commercials featured the jingle, "Reads, Your Something Special Store".  Read's operated in its hometown of Bridgeport until 1987 when Campeau Corp. of Canada, which had bought Allied Stores, merged it into Allied's sister division, Jordan Marsh of Boston, Massachusetts, and the stores subsequently took on the Jordan Marsh name.

In 1988, Campeau acquired Federated Department Stores of Cincinnati, Ohio and operated it in conjunction with Allied, subsequently declaring bankruptcy in 1990.  As a result of the overall decline of Bridgeport's downtown shopping area, the Lafayette Plaza store closed in 1989, and all but the Trumbull and Jefferson Valley stores were closed by 1992 under the Federated/Allied Stores bankruptcy filing.

In 1993, these remaining two stores at  Trumbull and Jefferson Valley  were converted to the Abraham & Straus nameplate when that division of Federated Department Stores merged with Jordan Marsh (as they were in the New York Metropolitan media market, they could operate more efficiently regarding advertising under the A&S name).  In 1995 after Federated acquired Macy's, it consolidated its A&S/Jordan Marsh division into Macy's East and renamed the two former Read's stores with the Macy's moniker.

The former Read's Trumbull location was abandoned in 2006, when Macy's relocated into the former Filene's store in the Westfield Trumbull shopping center upon the completion of the merger of the Federated and May Department Stores chains.  Only the Jefferson Valley Mall store that Read's opened in 1983 has continually operated as a department store to present day.

Artspace Read's, Bridgeport

In the late 1990s the former Read's Building in downtown Bridgeport was converted into useful space for artists, run as a non-profit, called Artspace, also known as Read's Artspace, Sterling Market Lofts, and Artspace Read's. The conversion and complete restoration of the building by Artspace Projects cost $14.1 million, and created "61 spacious live/work units on the upper floors and arts-friendly commercial space on the ground floor". Construction was carried out by A.P. Construction, under a contract worth $10,500,000. The new Sterling Market Lofts building opened in May 2005.

See also

History of Bridgeport, Connecticut
List of defunct department stores of the United States

References

External links 
Read's Department Store Souvenir Plate - Bridgeport Public Library

Defunct department stores based in Connecticut
Defunct companies based in Connecticut
Retail companies established in 1857
Retail companies disestablished in 1993
Companies that filed for Chapter 11 bankruptcy in 1990
Companies based in Bridgeport, Connecticut
1857 establishments in Connecticut